This is a list of some Tamil literature which is dedicated to the Hindu god Ganesha. The list is grouped historically.
 Vinayagar Agaval - by Avvaiyaar
 Tirunaraiyur Vinayaka Tiru irattai manimalai by Nambiyandar Nambi (c. 10th century AD)
 Aludaya Pillaiyar Tiruvantadi by Nambiyandar Nambi (c. 10th century AD)
 Aludaya Pillaiyar Tiruchabai viruttam by Nambiyandar Nambi (c. 10th century AD)
 Aludaya Pillaiyar Mummanikovai by Nambiyandar Nambi (c. 10th century AD)
 Aludaya Pillaiyar Tiruvulamalai by Nambiyandar Nambi (c. 10th century AD)
 Aludaya Pillaiyar Tirukkalambakam by Nambiyandar Nambi (c. 10th century AD)
 Aludaya Pillaiyar Tiruttogai by Nambiyandar Nambi (c. 10th century AD)

References

Hymns
Ganesha
Tamil-language literature
Tamil Hindu literature